The BHP Nevada Railroad  was a shortline railroad that operated in Nevada from 1996 to 1999. BHP acquired the line from Nevada Northern Railway. Constructed by Utah Construction Company in 1908, the railroad hauled copper ore concentrate from BHP's concentrator at Riepetown to Shafter, Nevada. At Shafter the railroad interchanged with the Union Pacific and the ore continued to BHP's smelter at San Manuel, Arizona.  BHP is an Australian-based company that took over Magma Copper, the owner of the Robinson Mine at Ruth, Nevada, in January 1996. The line ran south from a connection with the Union Pacific at Shafter to Ely.

Locomotives
The BHP Nevada Railroad used five former Southern Pacific Railroad EMD SD9 locomotives built between 1954 and 1956 to operate over the line. They were numbered #201 – 205. For switching and local operations the railroad used two GE 70-ton switchers from the Santa Maria Valley Railroad. BHP also had one ALCO RS-3. The switchers were also built in the 1950s and numbered #12 and #13.

Nevada Northern Railway Museum

BHP ended up turning over its locomotives and rolling stock to the Nevada Northern Railway Museum as part of a settlement over their track lease agreement.

A small portion of the BHP Nevada Railroad was operated over the Nevada Northern Railway Museum tracks with trackage rights between East Ely and Ruth. The line was abandoned in 1999 when copper mining was discontinued, however in 2004 the mines were reopened, and the copper concentrate was hauled by road. The disused line between Ely and Cobre was acquired by the city of Ely in 2006.

Route
Stations, listed from north to south:

Shafter, Nevada (connection with the Union Pacific Railroad, former Western Pacific)
Decoy
Dolly Varden
Mizpah
Currie
Goshute
Greens
Cherry Creek
Schellbourne (Ray)
Requa (Raiff)
Warm Springs
Steptoe
Glenn
McGill Junction
J&M Spur
Hiline Junction (Hi Line Junction)
Mosier
East Ely
Ore Yard
Calumet
Tunnel 1
Lane
Keystone
Lone Tree Road
Ruth
Sunshine
Tripp Pit
Riepetown

See also
 List of defunct Nevada railroads
 White Knob Copper Electric Railway: a copper ore railway in Idaho
 Mansfeld Mining Railway: a copper ore railway in Germany
 Otavi Mining and Railway Company: a copper ore railway in Namibia

References

Other sources

Defunct Nevada railroads
Mining in Nevada
Mining railways in the United States
1996 establishments in Nevada
1999 disestablishments in Nevada
Railway companies established in 1996
Railway companies disestablished in 1999
Copper mining in the United States